Joe MacGuire is an American politician and a Republican member of the Wyoming House of Representatives for District 35.

Elections

2016
Incumbent Republican Representative Kendell Kroeker had been elected to a fourth term in the Wyoming House of Representatives, but abruptly announced his resignation before the start of the next legislative session. Natrona County Commissioners met to choose Kroeker's replacement, narrowing the list to MacGuire, former Casper City Councilman Ed Opella, and pastor Bruce Sell. MacGuire was chosen as Kroeker's successor, and was sworn in on the same day as other new state legislators.

References

External links
Official page at the Wyoming Legislature

Living people
Republican Party members of the Wyoming House of Representatives
Politicians from Casper, Wyoming
University of Wyoming alumni
Year of birth missing (living people)
21st-century American politicians